Caroline Miller may refer to:

 Caroline Pafford Miller (1903–1992), American novelist
 Caroline Adams Miller (born 1961), American non-fiction author and life coach
 Caroline Miller (character), from Malcolm in the Middle
 Caroline Miller (politician), American politician and writer
 Caroline Miller (planner), New Zealand historian and planning professor
 Caroline Miller (soccer) (born 1991), American soccer player

See also 
 Caroline Millar (born 1958), Australian diplomat